Craig Michael Titus (born January 14, 1965, in Wyandotte, Michigan) is an American former professional bodybuilder and convicted murderer.

Early life 
Titus lived most of his early life in Riverview, near Detroit. He has a younger brother, Kevin, and a younger sister, Nicole. Titus played high school football but quit because at 5'6" he felt he was too small. He also wrestled.

Career 
When Titus graduated from high school, he was 5'6" and 140 lbs. By the age of 21, he was 5'8" and 185 lbs. Once he started seeing good results from weight training, he decided to become a bodybuilder. His first bodybuilding show was the 1988 Houston Bodybuilding Championships in which he won the Men's Open middleweight class and the overall title.

Criminal convictions 

In April 1995 in Louisiana, Titus pleaded guilty to conspiracy to possess with intent to distribute ecstasy, and was sentenced to 16 months' house arrest via monitoring with an electronic anklet. In July 1997, Titus was sentenced to 21 months in prison for violating his probation by using anabolic steroids.

In December 2005, Titus and his wife Kelly Ryan were implicated in the death of Melissa James, their personal assistant, in Las Vegas, Nevada. Titus admitted to an affair with James. After fleeing cross-country, the couple was arrested in Stoughton, Massachusetts.

In February 2006, after being extradited to Nevada from Boston, Titus and Ryan were denied bail. On March 29, both pleaded not guilty to a felony charge for killing their live-in assistant. The charge carried the possibility of the death penalty.

Despite previous statements asserting their innocence, both Titus and Ryan pleaded guilty to various charges on May 30, 2008, just days before their murder trial was set to begin in Las Vegas.

On August 22, 2008, Titus was convicted of second-degree murder, kidnapping and arson. He was sentenced to 21 to 55 years in prison, while Ryan was sentenced to two consecutive terms of 3–13 years in prison.

Anthony Gross, also charged as an accomplice in the crime, pleaded guilty in February 2009 and received probation.

Competitions and titles 

 2005 IFBB Iron Man Pro—6th
 2004 IFBB GNC Show Of Strength—6th
 2004 IFBB Florida Xtreme Pro Challenge—7th
 2004 IFBB Grand Prix Australia—6th
 2004 IFBB Arnold Classic And Internationals—6th
 2004 IFBB Iron Man Pro—5th
 2003 IFBB Night Of Champions—3rd
 2002 IFBB GNC Show Of Strength—7th
 2002 Mr. Olympia—11th
 2002 Night of Champions XIV—5th
 2002 Southwest Pro—7th
 2001 British Grand Prix—9th
 2001 Mr. Olympia—12th
 2001 Arnold Classic—6th
 2001 San Francisco Grand Prix—2nd
 2001 Ironman Pro Invitational—5th
 2000 Toronto Pro—5th
 2000 Arnold Classic—10th
 2000 Night of Champions—11th
 2000 Ironman Pro Invitational—8th
 1996 NPC USA Championships—1st Heavyweight and Overall (earning pro card in the IFBB)
 1995 NPC USA Championships—2nd Heavyweight
 1994 NPC National Championships—2nd Heavyweight
 1994 NPC USA Championships—2nd Heavyweight
 1993 NPC USA Championships—4th Heavyweight
 1991 NPC Ironman/Ironmaiden—Overall
 1990 NPC Tournament of Champions—3rd Heavyweight
 1990 NPC Western Cup—Overall
 1989 NPC Houston Bodybuilding Championships—Overall
 1988 NPC Houston Bodybuilding Championships—1st Middleweight and Overall

See also 

List of male professional bodybuilders
List of female professional bodybuilders

References

Bibliography 

 Fire in the Desert: The True Story of the Craig Titus-Kelly Ryan Murder Mystery by Glenn Puit (Stephens Press, published February 2007) 
 Swift Injustice: The Craig Titus Story by Tracy Mitchell-Milam (TMM Publishing, published July 17, 2015)

External links 
 Bodybuilder Craig Titus Tribute
  Contest history Muscle Memory competition history
  Indictment Grand jury indictment of Craig Titus, Kelly Ryan, and Anthony Gross

1967 births
Living people
American people convicted of arson
American bodybuilders
American sportspeople convicted of crimes
American people convicted of kidnapping
American people convicted of murder
American people of French descent
American people of Greek descent
American people convicted of drug offenses
People convicted of murder by Nevada
People from Detroit
People from Wyandotte, Michigan
Professional bodybuilders